Epichorista samata is a species of moth of the family Tortricidae. It is found in New Guinea.

References

Moths described in 1941
Epichorista